The main point of contention in the umpiring of the 1974–75 Ashes series was the intimidatory bowling of the Australian fast bowlers Dennis Lillee and Jeff Thomson. There were a few other issues, though there were the usual cases of batsmen being given out or not out despite the differing opinions of the players and umpire. At the time, umpires had no recourse to slow motion replays and had to make decisions based on what they saw in a split second, with the benefit of the doubt always going to the batsman. As a result it was not uncommon for umpires to make mistakes, which over the course of a long series tended to cancel each other out. The best an umpire could do was to make an honest judgement based on what he saw. Tom Brooks and Robin Bailhache were the umpires in all six Tests, but were junior for so important a series. Brooks having made his debut in the 1970–71 Ashes series and Bailhache in the First Test at Brisbane. Unusually for Australian umpires of the time Brooks had played First Class Cricket – he had been a lively fast-medium bowler – and as a result was more able to connect with the Test players, and was more forgiving of short-pitched deliveries which he saw as a natural part of the game. This helped England in 1970–71 when they had the fast bowlers John Snow and Bob Willis, but proved fatal for their batsmen in 1974–75.

Intimidatory bowling
Ian Chappell...made it clear more than once that he regarded the control of his side on the field as the concern solely of the umpires. Poor wretched men! I wonder what Ian thought might have happened if either Tom Brooks or Robin Bailhache had applied the full sanction of Law 46, and had banned either Lillee or Thomson on that emotion-charged Sunday afternoon. How many beer-cans might have besplattered the field, and angry spectators invaded the playing area? As it was the umpires contented themselves with friendly warnings afterwards described as 'unofficial'. In the circumstances it was hard to blame them.
E.W. Swanton
The England team thought that the Australian umpires failed to apply Law 46; 'the persistent bowling of fast short-pitched balls at the batsman is unfair if, in the opinion of the umpire at the bowler's end, it constitutes a systematic attempt at intimidation'. Wisden noted that "never in the 98 years of Test cricket have batsmen been so grievously bruised and battered by ferocious, hostile, short-pitched balls". Both Dennis Lillee and Jeff Thomson had written and stated that they liked to bowl bouncers to intimidate batsmen, with Thomson's 'blood on the wicket' statement particularly offending old-fashioned sensibilities. Traditionally it was the job of the captain to restrain his bowlers if they became too aggressive, but Ian Chappell refused to do so and the Australian umpires were loath to give them official warnings. It is rare in Test cricket for an umpire to give a bowler an official warning or to ban him, and in Sydney the crowd would not have accepted such a move. To be fair the England fast bowlers John Snow and Bob Willis had bowled short and fast on the previous tour and Chappell "employed almost the identical tactics used by Illingworth and Snow in 1970-71" when the tourists had complained about Umpire Rowan's interference. Willis returned to bowl short in 1974-75, but was injury prone and not as fast as either Lillee or Thomson. It was possible for umpires to curb even a fast bowler like Lillee, as Dickie Bird was to demonstrate in England, but Brooks and Bailhache were relatively inexperienced and lacked authority. They also lacked the backing of the Australia Board of Control who enjoyed record profits from the series thanks to the crowd-drawing qualities of the bowlers. Keith Fletcher had his arm bruised by Thomson in the First Test and Dennis Amiss and John Edrich their hands bruised from being constantly hit with short balls. Wally Edwards was hit by a Willis bouncer in the Second Test, Colin Cowdrey on the arm by Lillee and David Lloyd painfully in the groin by Thomson. The Third Test had Fred Titmus struck a blow to the back of the knee from a ball by Thomson. In the Fourth Test Tony Greig hit Lillee on the elbow and Ashley Mallett on his bowling hand with his medium paced bouncers, John Edrich had his ribs broken when he ducked into a Lillee bouncer that kept low and Fletcher was hit on the head. In the Sixth Test Greg Chappell was struck on the chin by Peter Lever. Edrich (twice), Amiss and Lloyd were all dropped from Tests due to the severity of their injuries.

Bad Light
At 3:30pm two umpires emerged from the players' race leading from the dressing rooms. The crowd roared its approval. It seemed there was going to be more play. The cordon of policemen, reinforced after the spectator intrusions of the first day, respectfully made way to allow the umpires to pass. But wait! Surely Tom Brooks does not have a beard. Robin Bailhache, slight in build though he is, is slightly more substantial than the youthful beanpole figure making his way to the centre. It took Bill Watkins, the groundsman at the M.C.G. to detect the impersonation. He hurried from his post by the covers in the centre of the ground to intercept the impostors and turn them back from whence they came. In tribute to a skillful piece of improvised humour, police sergeant Brian Watkins allowed them to make good their escape, instead of conducting them to the local lock-up.
Frank Tyson
The Australian umpires were willing to give the batsmen the benefit of bad light if there was a thunderstorm in the offing, or the Australian sunset came too soon and were particularly prone to do this if Lillee, Thomson or Willis were bowling. In the second innings of the First Test at Brisbane there was 35 minutes for England to bat until stumps, but as a stormcloud loomed over the ground and Dennis Lillee and Jeff Thomson were sending down three short balls an over. Bailhache told them they should bowl fuller, but the next ball was a Thommo bouncer and the umpire gave the English batsmen the benefit of the bad light. The Australian captain Ian Chappell complained about the umpire's interference as strictly speaking he could not tell the bowlers what to bowl and the ABC commentator Frank Tyson agreed. In the Third Test at Melbourne a couple of hoaxers dressed up as umpires during bad light and "sold the crowd a pup" before they were chased off.

The Crowds
The deterioration of crowd behavior in Australia has been marked and easily observable over the last few years...Exhibitionists, generally in drunken stupor, invaded the pitches...attempted to run the gauntlet of policemen patrolling the perimeter. When they intruded upon the playing area to congratulate their heros, their sincereity extended to trying to steal their caps or snitching a bail or stump whilst the umpire was distracted by his concern for the pitch...umpire Brooks and an intruder clashed physically in the centre of the Test pitch. The invader was sent sprawling in the centre of the wicket by an exesperated umpire, who was no doubt unwise to intrude into the domain of law and order.
Frank Tyson
The unruliness of the crowd was readily apparent in 1974-75 as Australia beat England at home for the first time in 16 years they were more excitable than previously. "In the background the crowd, lusting for more blood and guts, stirred the embers of controversy chanting for 'Lillee, Lillee'" and the MCG was compared to the Colosseum or the World Cup. Australian drinking laws allowed alcohol to be sold in the grounds even when it was banned outside and in the heat many spectators became drunk. In the Third Test at Melbourne two supporters climbed the picket fence and reached the wicket before Brooks decided to physically remove one, which damaged the wicket. At Sydney in the Fourth Test Rick McCosker was disturbed by the rumpus from the notorious Sydney Hill, its members pelted Tony Greig with food and cans (some containing urine) and later did the same to the scoreboard. One full can hit Greig on the back, and Brooks had to intervene to calm them down and have the field cleared of rubbish before play could resume.

Other Decisions
Walker stole a single to mid-off and with his eye fixed exclusively on the swooping fieldsman, Denness, hurtled blindly towards the bowler's wicket. Umpire Brooks, too, was concentrating on the ball and fieldsman whilst moving towards the off side and was skittled by the batsman who flung himself in the direction of safety with little or no consideration for the safety of others. Walker beat Denness's return to the wicket, but at the cost of a collision between the immovable mass and the irresistible force. Umpire Brooks, having been a first class bowler in his day was a man of some substance, and pound for pound was a good match for the burly Walker. Umpire and bowler toppled slowly to the ground and...resumed their upright position slowly...
Frank Tyson
In the Third Test at Melbourne Tony Greig was controversially run out when England were 157/6. Ian Chappell had thrown the ball in from the boundary as Greig was completing his third run and Marsh caught the ball and smashed the stumps as the 6'7" South African reached for the crease with his long handled bat. Photographs later showed that he had just made his ground, but Bailhache gave him out and Greig refused to go until rudely told to leave by Greg Chappell. In the Fifth Test at the Adelaide Oval Max Walker hit what looked like an easy two only to end up at the same end as Lillee as Mike Denness threw down the stumps after a fine pick up. Lillee tried to walk to keep Walker in as he was the better batsman, but Dennis Amiss insisted that Walker was the man to go as Lillee has not left his ground and the umpire agreed. Walker had trouble again (see the above quote) in the Sixth Test at Melbourne: the burly Tasmanian ran straight into Umpire Brooks trying to avoid a run out that sent both to the ground, but Walker survived with his wicket intact. In the Third Test at Melbourne John Edrich tried to glance a ball from Ashley Mallett and was caught by Rod Marsh for 49. Bailhache gave him out, though the batsmen later said he had missed and the ball had come off his pads.

References

Bibliography
 Patrick Eagar and Graeme Wright, Test Decade 1972/1982', World's Work Ltd, 1982
 Tom Graveney and Norman Miller, The Ten Greatest Test Teams, Sidgewick and Jackson, 1988
 E.W. Swanton, Swanton in Australia with MCC 1946–75, Fontant, 1977
 Frank Tyson, Test of Nerves, Test series 1974-75 Australia versus England, Manark Pty Ltd, 1975
 Bob Willis and Patrick Murphy, Starting With Grace, A Pictorial Celebration of Cricket 1864-1986, 1986

Annual reviews
 Playfair Cricket Annual 1971
 Wisden Cricketers' Almanack 1971

Further reading
 Peter Arnold, The Illustrated Encyclopaedia of World of Cricket, W.H. Smith, 1985
 Mark Browning, Rod Marsh: A Life in Cricket, Rosenberg Publishing, 2003
 Ian Brayshaw, The Chappell Era, ABC Enterprises, 1984
 Ian Chappell and Ashley Mallett, Hitting Out: The Ian Chappell Story, Orion, 2006
 Colin Cowdrey, M. C. C. The Autobiography of a Cricketer, Coronet Books, 1977
 Bill Frindall, The Wisden Book of Test Cricket 1877–1978, Wisden, 1979
 Colin Firth, Pageant of Cricket, The MacMillan Company of Australia,1987
 Chris Harte, A History of Australian Cricket, Andre Deutsch, 1993
 Ken Kelly and David Lemmon, Cricket Reflections: Five Decades of Cricket Photographs, Heinemann, 1985
 Dennis Lillee, Lillee, My Life in Cricket, Methuen Australia, 1982
 Dennis Lillee, Menace: the Autobiography, Headline Book Publishing, 2003
 Ashley Mallett, Rowdy, Lynton Publications, 1973
 Ashley Mallett, Spin Out, Garry Sparke & Associates, 1977
 Ashley Mallett, One Of A Kind: The Doug Walters Story, Orion, 2009
 Rod Marsh, The Gloves of Irony, Pan, 1999
 Adrian McGregor, Greg Chappell, Collins, 1985
 Mark Peel, The Last Roman: A Biography of Colin Cowdrey, Andre Deutsch Ltd, 1999
 Ray Robinson, On Top Down Under, Cassell, 1975
 E.W. Swanton (ed), The Barclays World of Cricket, Collins, 1986
 Huw Turbervill, The Toughest Tour: The Ashes Away Series: 1946 to 2007, Aurum Press Ltd, 2010
 Derek Underwood, Beating the Bat: An Autobiography, S.Paul, 1975
 Bob Willis, Lasting the Pace, Collins, 1985

Video
 Allan Border and David Gower, The Best Of The Ashes – 1970–1987'', 2 Entertain Video, 1991

1974 in Australian cricket
1974 in English cricket
1975 in Australian cricket
1975 in English cricket
1974
Cricket umpiring